The 1984 UK Championship (also known as the 1984 Coral UK Championship for sponsorship reasons) was a ranking professional snooker tournament that took place at the Guild Hall in Preston, England, between 18 November and 2 December 1984. This was the eighth edition of the UK Championship but only the first to be granted ranking status, as it was now open to all professional overseas players as well as those from the UK. The BBC aired the event from the second round onwards. The championship was sponsored by sports betting company Coral.

The defending champion was Alex Higgins who won the 1983 event after defeating Steve Davis 16–15 in the final. The pair met in the final again, with Davis winning 16–8, to win his third UK Championship title. The highest break of the tournament was a 135 made by Jack McLaughlin during the non-televised stages; the highest break of the televised stages was a 134 made by Davis. There was a total prize fund of £101,000 with the winner receiving £20,000.

Prize fund
The winner of the event received a total of £20,000. The breakdown of prize money for this year is shown below:

Main draw
The tournament featured 32 players. Players in bold denote match winners.

Round of 32 Best of 17 frames

 Alex Higgins 9–7 Tony Jones 

 Bill Werbeniuk 1–9 Rex Williams 

 Willie Thorne 9–7 John Parrott 

 Eddie Charlton 9–4 Silvino Francisco 

 Cliff Thorburn 9–4 Jack McLaughlin 

 Terry Griffiths 6–9 Cliff Wilson 

 David Taylor 9–6 Murdo MacLeod 

 Ray Reardon 9–2 Danny Fowler 

 Kirk Stevens 9–7 Tony Chappel 

 John Spencer 6–9 Joe Johnson 

 Tony Knowles 9–5 Marcel Gauvreau 

 Dennis Taylor 9–6 Warren King 

 Jimmy White 9–5 John Campbell 

 Doug Mountjoy 9–2 Mike Hallett 

 Steve Davis 9–1 Tommy Murphy 

 Tony Meo 9–4 Eugene Hughes

Final

Century breaks
A total of 28 century breaks were made during the tournament.

 135  Jack McLaughlin
 134, 120, 108, 106  Steve Davis
 132, 125  Cliff Thorburn
 129, 124, 100  Alex Higgins
 121  Eddie Sinclair
 119, 114, 102  Tony Chappel
 119  Willie Thorne
 113, 100  Tony Jones
 111  Peter Francisco
 111  Tony Meo
 110  Malcolm Bradley
 108  Steve Newbury
 107  Tony Knowles
 105  Jimmy White
 102  Eddie Charlton
 101  John Parrott
 100  Paddy Browne
 100  Robby Foldvari
 100  Cliff Wilson

References

1984
UK Championship
UK Championship
UK Championship
UK Championship